What Kind of Fool Am I may refer to:

"What Kind of Fool Am I?, a 1962 single by Sammy Davis Jr.
"What Kind of Fool Am I" (Rick Springfield song), a 1982 single by Rick Springfield

See also
 What Kind of Fool (disambiguation)